Here Come the Bombs is the debut solo album of former Supergrass front man Gaz Coombes, who performed all of the instruments on the album. It was released on 21 May 2012 by record label Hot Fruit Recordings. It charted at #54 on the UK Albums Chart.

Track listing
All songs written by Gaz Coombes except tracks 2, 3, 6, 9 & 11; written by Gaz Coombes & Sam Williams.

References

2012 debut albums
Gaz Coombes albums